The Brandon Road Lock and Dam is a lock and dam complex along the Des Plaines River in Joliet, Illinois. The complex was built from 1927 to 1933 in conjunction with the construction of the Illinois Waterway, which allowed for barge travel between Lake Michigan and the Mississippi River. The lock and dam are also used to regulate water levels on the river between Lockport and Joliet. The complex also includes a disused junction lock for the Illinois and Michigan Canal, the control station for the lock, and a modern pump house.

The complex was added to the National Register of Historic Places as the Brandon Road Lock and Dam Historic District on March 10, 2004.

References

Buildings and structures completed in 1933
Buildings and structures in Will County, Illinois
Dams on the National Register of Historic Places in Illinois
Locks on the National Register of Historic Places in Illinois
Historic districts on the National Register of Historic Places in Illinois
National Register of Historic Places in Will County, Illinois
Transportation buildings and structures in Will County, Illinois
History of Joliet, Illinois